Wade Hampton Hicks House is a historic home located at Hartsville, Darlington County, South Carolina.  It was built in 1901, and expanded with a second story in 1919.  It is a two-story, three bay, rectangular American Craftsman inspired residence, set upon a brick foundation.  It has a hipped roof with wide overhangs and exposed rafter tails and a one-story hipped roof wraparound porch.  Also on the property is a small wooden carriage house/smokehouse, constructed about 1901. It was the home of Wade Hampton Hicks (1874-1945), prominent Hartsville farmer and businessman who founded W.H. Hicks and Son Feed and Seed Company.

It was listed on the National Register of Historic Places in 1994.

References

Houses on the National Register of Historic Places in South Carolina
Houses completed in 1919
Houses in Hartsville, South Carolina
National Register of Historic Places in Darlington County, South Carolina